The canton of Châtillon-sur-Chalaronne  is an administrative division in eastern France. At the French canton reorganisation which came into effect in March 2015, the canton was expanded from 16 to 26 communes:
 
L'Abergement-Clémenciat
La Chapelle-du-Châtelard
Châtillon-sur-Chalaronne
Condeissiat
Dompierre-sur-Chalaronne
Garnerans
Genouilleux
Guéreins
Illiat
Marlieux
Mogneneins
Montceaux
Montmerle-sur-Saône
Neuville-les-Dames
Peyzieux-sur-Saône
Romans
Saint-André-le-Bouchoux
Saint-Didier-sur-Chalaronne
Saint-Étienne-sur-Chalaronne
Saint-Georges-sur-Renon
Saint-Germain-sur-Renon
Saint-Paul-de-Varax
Sandrans
Sulignat
Thoissey
Valeins

Demographics

References

See also
Cantons of the Ain department 
Communes of France

Cantons of Ain